The National Centre for e-Social Science (NCeSS) was a UK based centre which aimed to promote e-Social Science.  It was founded circa 2003 with funding from the Economic and Social Research Council (ESRC) to investigate how innovative and powerful computer-based infrastructure and tools developed over the previous three years under the UK e-Science programme could benefit social science. The foundation of much of the work was the use of computational infrastructure that was collaboratively provisioned and worked across organisational boundaries. Collaboration was key and the computational approach was commonly known as 'Grid Computing'.

e-Social Science refers to the use of enhanced computer and information technology infrastructure and tools for social science. The role of NCeSS was to investigate specific applications of e-Social Science, develop tools to support them and to advise on the future strategic direction of e-Social Science and e-Science more generally. NCeSS also provided information, training, advice, support and on-line resources to help the social science research community adopt e-Social Science approaches. NCeSS developed a portal based e-Infrastructure based on Sakai to support e-Social Science, but it was short lived due to lack of resources for sustaining it.

NCeSS was coordinated from the University of Manchester, and involved groups from various other UK universities. The NCeSS research programme included applications of e-Science in both quantitative and qualitative social sciences, and studies of issues relevant to promoting the wider adoption of e-Science.

NCeSS gradually stopped functioning and the NCeSS Sakai Portal went off line in around 2011.

By 2015, little remains online to indicate that NCeSS ever existed, but the Internet Archive Way Back Machine captured something of the Web Site that once was.

E-Science
Grid computing projects
Information technology organisations based in the United Kingdom
Organisations based in Manchester
Science and technology in Greater Manchester
Social science institutes
Social sciences organizations
University of Manchester